A runout may include any of the following:

Run-out, an inaccuracy of rotating mechanical systems, specifically when a tool or shaft does not rotate exactly in line with the main axis. 
  Run out,  a method of dismissal in the sport of cricket.
Refusals and runouts, in equestrian sport, an attempt to evade an obstacle.
Run Out (film), 2012 Film